Phallata (Aymara phallaña to burst, -ta a suffix, "burst" or "exploded", also spelled Pallada, Pallana) is a mountain north of the Cordillera Real in the Andes of Bolivia which reaches a height of approximately . It is located in the La Paz Department, Larecaja Province, Sorata Municipality. It lies at a lake of that name (Pallada).

References 

Mountains of La Paz Department (Bolivia)